Guardians of the Tomb is a 2018 Australian-Chinese science fiction horror thriller film directed and written by Kimble Rendall, starring Li Bingbing, Kellan Lutz, Kelsey Grammer and Wu Chun. It is the largest co-production to date between China and Australia. The film was released on January 19, 2018.

Synopsis
A team of scientists lose a colleague in an ancient labyrinth while trying to make the discovery of a century. The group must battle their way through a swarm of deadly, man-eating funnel web spiders and discover the secret behind the arachnids' power and intelligence.

Cast
Li Bingbing as Jia
Kellan Lutz as Jack Ridley
Kelsey Grammer as Mason
Wu Chun as Luke
Stef Dawson as Milly Piper
Shane Jacobson as Gary
Ryan Johnson as Ethan
Jason Chong as Chen Xu

Box office
Guardians of the Tomb opened in China on January 19, 2018. Previously titled Nest, it placed fourth at the box office on the Friday of its opening week, with $3.22 million, and eventually reached a three-day total of $6.11 million.

References

External links

2018 films
2010s adventure films
Australian science fiction horror films
Chinese science fiction films
Chinese action adventure films
2010s science fiction horror films
Australian science fiction thriller films
Australian action adventure films
Australian horror thriller films
Films shot at Village Roadshow Studios
2010s English-language films